Victor Starffin (1 May 1916 – 12 January 1957), nicknamed , was a Japanese baseball player. While playing in Japan, he became the first professional pitcher in Japan to win 300 games. With 83 career shutouts, he ranks number one all-time in Japanese professional baseball.

Biography

Early years 
Victor (or Viktor) Starffin (Starukhin) was born in 1916 in Nizhny Tagil, in the Urals region of what was then the Russian Empire, but after the Russian Revolution he moved with his family to northern Hokkaidō, where he attended Asahikawa Higashi High School.

Starffin wanted to get into Waseda University, but he was scouted by Matsutaro Shoriki in the autumn of 1934 as a member of the national baseball team for an exhibition game against the United States. At that time, the Ministry of Education had a regulation stating that high school baseball players who played professionally forfeited their eligibility to enter higher education, so Starffin was reluctant to turn pro. However, he and his family had entered Japan on transit visas, and his father, Konstantin Starffin, was in jail awaiting trial on charges of involuntary manslaughter, both of which put the family at risk of deportation. Shoriki effectively blackmailed Starffin, stating that if Starffin refused to play professionally, Shoriki would use his connections with the Yomiuri Shimbun to publicise the details of Konstantin Starffin's case.

Tōkyō Kyojingun/Yomiuri Giants 
Starffin was signed by the Tōkyō Kyojingun (now the Yomiuri Giants), outside the draft, in 1936, and played for them until 1944. He was one of the premier pitchers in the Japanese baseball "dead-ball era" (pre-1945), when many of Japan's best players were serving in the Imperial Japanese Army. He won two MVP awards and a Best Nine award, and won at least 26 games in six different years, winning a league record 42 games in 1939. He followed his record-setting 1939 performance with another 38 wins in 1940.

World War II 
In 1940, as xenophobia increased in Japan, Starffin was forced to change his name to Suda Hiroshi. Later, during World War II, wartime paranoia resulted in Starffin being placed in a detention camp at Karuizawa with diplomats and other foreign residents.

Post-war career 

After a brief period working as an interpreter for the U.S. Occupation authorities (SCAP), Starffin returned to professional baseball in 1946, but chose not to return to the Giants, instead signing a contract with a new team, the Pacific Baseball Club, owned by Komajiro Tamura. Pacific's contracts with several famous players, including Starffin, led to a serious conflict, and Pacific was forced to forfeit four games. However, this decision ultimately resulted in Starffin's old team the Giants losing the first Japanese championship after World War II, as one of Pacific's forfeited games had been a loss to Great Ring (now the Fukuoka SoftBank Hawks): the change from a loss to a win gave Great Ring the title over the Giants.

Starffin stayed with Pacific in 1947, which became known as the Taiyo Robins. In 1948 he moved to Tamura's other team, the Kinsei/Daiei Stars, staying with that franchise through 1953 (although Tamura sold the team to Daiei Film after the 1948 season). Starffin finally signed with the Takahashi/Tombow Unions (a forerunner of the Chiba Lotte Marines) in 1954–55. In 1955, his last season, he became the first career 300-game winner in Japanese professional baseball. He retired in 1955 with a career record of 303 wins and 176 losses.

Retirement 
After retirement, he became an actor and presenter of radio programs.

Death 
In 1957, Starffin was killed in a traffic accident when the car he was driving was hit by a tram on the Tōkyū Tamagawa Line (now replaced by the Tōkyū Den-en-toshi Line) in Setagaya, Tokyo. The exact circumstances of the incident are debated to this day, with speculation ranging from a simple accident to suicide or drunk driving.

Starffin is buried in Tama Cemetery in Tokyo.

Tributes 
In 1960, he became the first foreigner elected to the Japanese Baseball Hall of Fame.

Asahikawa City has nicknamed its municipal baseball stadium, as Asahikawa Starffin Stadium, since 1984.

Personal life 
Starffin spoke fluent Japanese and was said to be "more Japanese than Japanese" with respect for his in-laws, but he was worried that his friends would never cross the line with the labels "foreigner" and "exile". It was said to be the case. Therefore, he went to the Orthodox church "Nikolai-do" in Ochanomizu (neighborhood in Tokyo) where other Russians emigrants gathered. He searched for friends and even found a bride.

Family 
In 1939 Starukhin married a Russian emigrant, Elena. In 1941, their first-born son was born. After staying in the Karuizawa camp, Elena filed for divorce and left with Bolovyov for the United States, leaving her seven-year-old son Starukhina.

The second wife was a Japanese woman Kunie in 1950, whom they met on Christmas at the Russian Club in Tokyo in 1948. She took care of his son, and they had two daughters. After the death of her husband, Kunie worked several jobs to support her family.

Professional Statistics 

*Bold = lead league

See also 
 Russians in Japan
 White Emigre
 Koji Ota

References

Further reading 

 Puff, Richard. "The Amazing Story of Victor Starffin". The National Pastime, no. 12 (1992), pp. 17–20.  .

External links 
 
Jim Albright's analysis of Starffin's candidacy for the American Baseball Hall of Fame
 Examples of Victor Starffin baseball cards

1916 births
1957 deaths
People from Nizhny Tagil
People from Verkhotursky Uyezd
Russian exiles
White Russian emigrants to Japan
Japanese baseball players
Russian baseball players
Yomiuri Giants players
Shochiku Robins players
Daiei Stars players
Takahashi Unions players
Expatriate baseball players in Japan
Japanese Baseball Hall of Fame inductees
Road incident deaths in Japan
World War II civilian prisoners held by Japan
Sportspeople from Sverdlovsk Oblast